Stein is a village in the Austrian state of Styria in the administrative district of Liezen. It is located in the valley of the river Enns, and is part of the municipality Lassing.

External links
Municipality Lassing 

Cities and towns in Liezen District